Jokceleny Fernandes Carvalho (born 21 October 1992), commonly known as Iniesta, is a São Toméan footballer who plays as a midfielder for UDRA and the São Tomé and Príncipe national team.

International career
Iniesta made his international debut for São Tomé and Príncipe in 2017.

International goals
Scores and results list São Tomé and Príncipe's goal tally first.

References

1992 births
Living people
Association football midfielders
Association football defenders
São Tomé and Príncipe footballers
São Tomé and Príncipe international footballers
UDRA players